The 2012–13 SK Sturm Graz season is the 104th season in club history.

Review and events
Peter Hyballa was hired as new coach of Sturm Graz on 16 May 2012. He takes over on 5 June 2012 when pre-season begins. Sporting Director Paul Gludovatz is on indefinite sick leave as of 22 May 2012. Gludovatz's contract was eventually dissolved by mutual consent.

Matches

Legend

Bundesliga

League results and appearances

League table

Overall league table

Summary table

ÖFB-Cup

Squad

Squad, appearances and goals

|-
! colspan="10" style="background:#dcdcdc; text-align:center;"| Goalkeepers

|-
! colspan="10" style="background:#dcdcdc; text-align:center;"| Defenders

|-
! colspan="10" style="background:#dcdcdc; text-align:center;"| Midfielders

|-
! colspan="10" style="background:#dcdcdc; text-align:center;"| Forwards

|}

Transfers

In

Out

Sources

Sturm Graz
2012-13 Sturm Graz Season